Mount Bruce may refer to:

 Mount Bruce (Antarctica)
 Mount Bruce (California), in Yosemite National Park, U.S.
 Mount Bruce (Western Australia)
 Pukaha / Mount Bruce National Wildlife Centre, in New Zealand